Fern Schumer Chapman is a journalist and author best known for her autobiographical book Motherland: Beyond the Holocaust - A Mother-Daughter Journey to Reclaim the Past.  Her second book, Is It Night or Day?, was released in 2010.  She is also the author of a blog, Half-life: A blog about immigration, loss and legacy.

Biography

Fern Schumer Chapman is a former reporter for the Chicago Tribune and Forbes magazine. Her work also has appeared in The Washington Post, U.S. News & World Report, Fortune, and The Wall Street Journal. A graduate of the University of Wisconsin–Madison with a master's degree from Northwestern University's Medill School of Journalism, Chapman has taught writing seminars at Northwestern University. .  She is the mother of three children.

Motherland: Beyond the Holocaust - A Mother-Daughter Journey to Reclaim the Past

The book is a non-fiction account that follows a young mother's pilgrimage into her family's history. Author Chapman uneasily accompanies her mother, Edith, a Holocaust escapee, on a baffling visit to the German village her mother left at the age of 12. Edith, the youngest member of the town's only Jewish family, was sent alone and terrified to America to escape the Nazis in 1938. Nearly half a century later, mother and daughter return to the village and gradually realize that no one has escaped the shame, guilt and lingering scars of the war. The book is used in middle school, high school and college classrooms, offering young people an opportunity to explore issues of fairness, identity and social justice.

Is It Night or Day?

Published by Farrar, Straus & Giroux, Chapman's second book was released in 2010. Is It Night or Day? captures Edith's immigration experience to America. Edith (the author's mother) was part of a small, little-known American rescue operation that saved about 1,000 children from the Nazis. Edith came to this country without her parents when she was only 12 years old.

Award and honors

Accolades for Is It Night or Day?

 Junior Library Guild selection 2010
 Booklist's Top Ten Historical Fiction for Youth list 2010
 YALSA Best Fiction for 2010 nominee
 Chicago Public Library's Best of the Best 2010
 Sydney Taylor Notable Book

Accolades for Motherland

 Illinois Author of the Year 2004 (Illinois Association of Teachers of English Award)
 Selection for Read for a Lifetime 2008 Booklist
 Selection for one book/one community for “Quad Cities Reads” and “Racine Reads”
 Film rights optioned
 Finalist for the National Jewish Book Awards
 Featured on “The Oprah Winfrey Show” (watch interview here)
 Named a “Discover New Great Writers” title by Barnes & Noble
 German and Dutch editions available

References

External links
 Official author website
 Half-life: A blog about immigration, loss and legacy
 NPR interview
 Chicago Tribune interview
 MakeItBetter.net article 'The Holocaust and Motherhood: Author Fern Schumer Chapman on Her New Book and Writing About Her Mom'

Year of birth missing (living people)
Living people
University of Wisconsin–Madison alumni
Medill School of Journalism alumni
Jewish American writers
21st-century American Jews